XHSHT-FM is a radio station on 102.5 FM in Saltillo, Coahuila, Mexico. The station carries the La Mejor grupera format from MVS Radio.

History
XESHT-AM on 1430 kHz received its concession on April 29, 1993. The 500-watt daytimer was owned by Radio Servicio Social, S.A., a subsidiary of Radiorama, and it later moved to 930 kHz.

XESHT received approval to migrate to FM in 2011. For most of the decade, it was operated by Multimedios Radio, first as La Más Buena and later as La Lupe, a Spanish adult hits format. Multimedios ceased operating XHSHT and XHSAC-FM 99.3 on August 1, 2020; operation of both stations went to RCG Media until the end of 2021, branding as "La Comadre". The Radiorama "Fiesta Mexicana" Regional Mexican format briefly was used before moving to XHSAC-FM 99.3 in preparation for an imminent launched of the La Mejor franchise from MVS Radio un January 31, 2022.

References

Radio stations in Coahuila
Radio stations established in 1993
Mass media in Saltillo